Muhammad Syahid bin Zaidon (born 12 August 1990 in Bentong, Pahang) is a Malaysian footballer who plays for PDRM in Malaysia Premier League as a central midfielder.

In 2014, Syahid has agreed terms with Felda United after have been released from the Harimau Muda squad as he is overaged.

Career statistics

Club

References

External links
 
 Young Tigers given early notice
 Stags beat Harimau to win S.League
 Harimau top-three bid dented by Hougang
 Young Tigers on course for third after 0-0 draw

Malaysian footballers
Felda United F.C. players
Negeri Sembilan FA players
1990 births
Living people
Association football midfielders